Pendurthi is a neighbourhood in the city of Visakhapatnam, India. The neighbourhood is considered as the major residential and commercial area in the city. It is located within the jurisdiction of the Greater Visakhapatnam Municipal Corporation, which is responsible for the civic amenities in Pendurthi. It is located on the west fringe of Visakhapatnam city.

Demographic

The total population of Pendurthi Mandal is 106,513 living in 24,543 Houses, 15 panchayats. Males are 53,800 and females are 52,713. There is a city in Pendurthi Mandal. Total 26,998 persons lives in town and 79,515 live in villages.

Geography
It has an average elevation of 22 meters (75 feet).

Transport 

 Pendurti railway station is located on Howrah-Chennai mainline. Some passenger trains stop at this station.
 It has a BRTS (Bus Rapid Transport System) corridor from Vizag city. The roads have an extension of up to 200 feet.
APSRTC to run buses every place to here.
APSRTC routes

Legislative Assembly
Pendurthi is an assembly constituency in Andhra Pradesh. There are 3,76,860 registered voters in Pendurthi constituency in 1999 elections.

See also 
 Pendurthi (Assembly constituency)

References 

Neighbourhoods in Visakhapatnam